The 1982 Navy Midshipmen football team represented the United States Naval Academy (USNA) as an independent during the 1982 NCAA Division I-A football season. The team was led by first-year head coach Gary Tranquill.

Schedule

Roster

References

Navy
Navy Midshipmen football seasons
Navy Midshipmen football